Dale L. Smith is an American political scientist and Professor of International Studies and Chair of Global Studies at the University of North Carolina Charlotte. He was Paul Piccard Distinguished Professor of Political Science at Florida State University between September 2014 and June 2016.

References

Living people
Florida State University faculty
University of North Carolina faculty
Massachusetts Institute of Technology alumni
American political scientists
Year of birth missing (living people)